Single-pair may refer to:

 Single-pair high-speed digital subscriber line, a data communications technology
 Single-pair shortest-path problem, the problem of finding a path between two vertices such that the sum of the weights of its constituent edges is minimized